God's Outlaw is a 1986 British historical film directed by Tony Tew and starring Roger Rees, Bernard Archard and Keith Barron. It depicts the historical figure of William Tyndale and his struggles with the authorities in the time of Henry VIII for translating the Bible into English.

Cast
 Sebastian Abineri ...  William Roye 
 Anthony Allen ...  Thomas Poyntz
 Bernard Archard ...  Sir Thomas More 
 Keith Barron ...  Henry VIII 
 Sharon Baylis ...  Mrs Poyntz 
 Alan Bennion ...  Archdeacon Bell
 Terence Budd ...  Stephen Vaughan 
 David Chivers ...  Old Priest 
 Arthur Cox ...  Peter Quentel
 Kenneth Gilbert ...  Humphrey Monmouth 
 Willoughby Goddard ...  Cardinal Wolsey 
 Terrence Hardiman ...  Thomas Cromwell 
 Stuart Harrison ...  Henry Phillips 
 Michael Haughey ...  Jacques Masson
 Harold Innocent ...  Doctor 
 Timothy Kightley ...  Priest 
 Oona Kirsch ...  Anne Boleyn 
 Leon Lissek ...  Herman Rincke
 Richard Mapletoft ...  Simon Mourton
 Frank Moorey ...  Johann Cochlaeus 
 Steve Newman ...  Richard 
 Tony Phillips ...  Messenger 
 Gary Raymond ...  Sir John Walsh 
 Roger Rees ...  William Tyndale 
 Pamela Salem ...  Lady Anne Walsh 
 Paul Shelley ...  John Frith 
 Joanna Tew ...  Girl 
 Derek Ware ...  Friar Stafford 
 George Waring ...  Bishop Tunstall 
 Lydia Watson ...  Lady in Waiting 
 Jerome Willis ...  Bishop Stokesley

References

External links

1987 films
British biographical films
Films set in Tudor England
Films about Christianity
Films about Henry VIII
1980s English-language films
1980s British films